This is a list of leaders of Armenia from 1918 to the present. It includes leaders of the short-lived First Republic of Armenia (1918–1920), Soviet Armenia (1920–1991), and the post-Soviet government.

Leaders of Armenia (1918–present)

Prime Minister of Armenia
Hovhannes Kajaznuni (30 June 1918 – 28 May 1919)
Alexander Khatisyan (28 May 1919 – 5 May 1920)
Hamazasp "Hamo" Ohanjanyan (5 May 1920 – 25 November 1920)
Simon Vratsian (25 November 1920 – 2 December 1920)

Transcaucasian Socialist Federative Soviet Republic (1922–1936) and Armenian Soviet Socialist Republic (1936–1991)
First Secretaries of the Communist Party of Armenia
Gevork Alikhanyan (December 1920 – April 1921)
Sargis Lukashin (April 1921 – 29 April 1922)
Askanaz Mravyan (29 April 1922 – March 1923)
Ashot Hovhannisyan (March 1923 – July 1927)
Haik Osepyan (July 1927 – April 1928)
Aykaz Kostanyan (April 1928 – 7 May 1930)
Aghasi Khanjian (7 May 1930 – 6 July 1936)
Amatuni Vardapetyan (13 July 1936 – 21 September 1937)
Grigory Arutinov (24 September 1937 – November 1953)
Suren Tovmasyan (November 1953 – 28 December 1960)
Yakov Zarobyan (28 December 1960 – 5 February 1966)
Anton Kochinyan (5 February 1966 – 27 November 1974)
Karen Demirchyan (27 November 1974 – 21 May 1988)
Suren Arutyunyan (21 May 1988 – 6 April 1990)
Vladimir Movsisyan (6 April 1990 – 30 November 1990)
Stepan Pogosyan (30 November 1990 – 14 May 1991)
Aram Gaspar Sargsyan (14 May 1991 – 7 September 1991)

Chairman of the Supreme Council
 Levon Ter-Petrossian (4 August 1990 – 11 November 1991)

Armenia (1991–present)

Presidents

References
Rulers of Armenia

External links
The Government of Armenia
President of Armenia

Heads of state of Armenia

Leaders
1991 establishments in Armenia
Armenia